Gamia is a genus of skippers in the family Hesperiidae.

Species
Gamia abri Miller & Collins, 1997
Gamia buchholzi (Plötz, 1879)
Gamia shelleyi (Sharpe, 1890)

References

Seitz, A. Die Gross-Schmetterlinge der Erde 13: Die Afrikanischen Tagfalter. Plate XIII 80

External links
Natural History Museum Lepidoptera genus database

Astictopterini
Hesperiidae genera